Donald James Stewart (17 October 1920 – 23 August 1992) was Scottish National Party (SNP) Member of Parliament (MP) from 1970 to 1987 for the Western Isles.  He also served as President of the Scottish National Party (SNP) from 1982 to 1987. He was a councillor in Stornoway for many years and twice served as the town's provost.

Early life
Stewart was born on 17 October 1920 in Stornoway, Western Isles, Scotland. He was educated at the Nicolson Institute. Stewart left school at 16 to work as a junior clerk in a local solicitor's office, before going on to work in the office of Kenneth Mackenzie Ltd, a Stornoway Harris Tweed firm. Following the war, he returned to Kenneth Mackenzie Ltd, eventually becoming a director. He remained with the firm until his election to Parliament in 1970.

Political career
A lifelong socialist, Stewart became convinced of the case for Scottish independence at the 1935 United Kingdom general election, and joined the Scottish National Party the following year. He also joined the Labour Party in 1937, but became disillusioned with the party and left it in 1939. He first elected to Stornoway Town Council in 1951, and remained a councillor until his election to Parliament in 1970. He stood in the 1952 Dundee East by-election. Stewart was the provost of Stornoway from 1959 to 1965, and again from 1968 to 1970. At the 1970 general election he was the SNP's first ever MP returned at a general election, and the last declared result in 1970, which caused great attention in the media.

Stewart was the SNP's sole Westminster representative from 1970 until he was joined by Margo MacDonald who won Glasgow Govan in the by-election of 1973. At the February 1974 General Election he was joined by six other SNP MPs, and at the October General Election of that year this number increased to eleven.  Stewart became the SNP parliamentary group leader, with William Wolfe as the SNP leader overall. In 1977, Donald Stewart was appointed as a Privy Counsellor.

When Robin Cook MP moved an amendment to legalise homosexual acts to the Bill which became the Criminal Justice (Scotland) Act 1980, he stated "The clause bears the names of hon. Members from all three major parties. I regret that the only party represented among Scottish Members of Parliament from which there has been no support for the clause is the Scottish National Party. I am pleased to see both representatives of that party in their place, and I hope to convert them in the remainder of my remarks." When the amendment came to a vote, Stewart and the SNP's other MP Gordon Wilson both voted against the decriminalisation of homosexual acts.

In 1981 Stewart attempted to introduce some provisions for Gaelic through a private members bill, but it was met with hostility from the Conservatives and talked out by Bill Walker. It was only with the introduction of the Gaelic Language (Scotland) Act 2005 by the devolved Scottish Parliament, that the language was afforded some official recognition.

In March 1985 Stewart announced he would retire from front-line politics at the next election, although continued to represent the Western Isles until 1987.  At the General Election of that year his replacement as SNP candidate Ian Smith, then the party's spokesman on transport, was defeated by Calum MacDonald of the Labour Party. The SNP vote dropped by 26% and the constituency saw an SNP to Labour swing of 19.6% in what was included by election analysts David Butler and Robert Waller as among the "exceptional results" seen in "individual constituencies" in that election.
Labour held it until the 2005 general election when it was regained by the SNP's Angus MacNeil.

Upon his retirement from Parliament, Stewart was offered a Life Peerage, but refused it. Stewart was working on an autobiography when he died in 1992. It was edited and completed by his sister, and published in 1994 as A Scot in Westminster.

It was Stewart who famously described the SNP as a "radical party, with a revolutionary aim".

Personal life
He married Christina MacAulay.

In August 1992 he suffered a heart attack. He died a week later, aged 71, at Lewis hospital, Stornoway.

References

External links 
 

1920 births
1992 deaths
Members of the Parliament of the United Kingdom for Scottish constituencies
Presidents of the Scottish National Party
Scottish National Party MPs
Provosts in Scotland
UK MPs 1970–1974
UK MPs 1974
UK MPs 1974–1979
UK MPs 1979–1983
UK MPs 1983–1987
Members of the Privy Council of the United Kingdom
People from Stornoway
People educated at the Nicolson Institute
Royal Navy personnel of World War II